Reginald Warren (born February 8, 1981) is an American professional basketball player for Veltex Shizuoka in Japan.

Career statistics 

|-
| align="left" |  2006-07
| align="left" | Takamatsu
| 37 || 20 || 29.4 || .510 || .282 || .564 || 9.0 || 2.5 || 1.2 || .5 ||  14.0
|-
| align="left" | 2007-08
| align="left" | Takamatsu
| 42 || 42 || 37.6 || .491 || .252 || .594 || 12.4 || 3.1 || 1.4 || .9 ||  21.6
|-
| align="left" |  2008-09
| align="left" | Saitama
| 47 || 47 || 38.4 || .467 || .324 || .552 || 12.3 || 3.5 || 1.3 || 1.0 || 21.9
|-
| align="left" | 2010-11
| align="left" | Kyoto
| 38 || 26 || 26.0 || .462 || .257 || .578 || 10.2 || 2.5 || 1.1 || .8 ||  13.4
|-
| align="left" |  2012-13
| align="left" | Fukuoka
| 52 || 51 || 33.0 || .464 || .359 || .594 || 12.6 || 2.4 || 1.2 || .8 ||  16.9
|-
| align="left" |  2013-14
| align="left" | Fukuoka
| 52 || 52 || 35.2 || .448 || .314 || .554 || 11.5 || 2.9 || 1.2 || .7 ||  16.5 
|-
| align="left" |  2014-15
| align="left" | Kyoto
| 48 ||36  ||25.2  || .422 ||.245  ||.569  || 8.5 || 2.0 ||1.3  || 0.4 || 13.4
|-
| align="left" |  2015-16
| align="left" | Hamamatsu
| 50 ||48  || 32.6 ||.422  || .281 || .495 ||13.6  ||3.4  || 1.0 || 0.6 ||  14.1
|-
| align="left" | 2016-17
| align="left" | Kumamoto
| 53 ||10  ||23.9  ||.442  ||.295  ||.627  || 8.5 || 1.8 || 0.8 || 0.7 ||  13.7
|-
| align="left" | 2017-18
| align="left" | Kagawa
|60 ||58  || 30.9 ||.456  || .304 ||.618  ||bgcolor="CFECEC"|12.7*  ||2.9  || 0.9 || 0.3 || 20.9
|-

References

1981 births
Living people
American expatriate basketball people in Israel
American expatriate basketball people in Japan
American expatriate basketball people in South Korea
American expatriate basketball people in Turkey
American expatriate basketball people in Venezuela
American men's basketball players
Changwon LG Sakers players
Guaiqueríes de Margarita players
İstanbul Teknik Üniversitesi B.K. players
Kagawa Five Arrows players
Kumamoto Volters players
Kyoto Hannaryz players
Marinos B.B.C. players
Rizing Zephyr Fukuoka players
Saitama Broncos players
San-en NeoPhoenix players
Spring Hill Badgers men's basketball players
West Florida Argonauts men's basketball players
Power forwards (basketball)